Pteraeolidia ianthina is a sea slug, an aeolid nudibranch in the family Facelinidae. It is known as a blue dragon, a name it shares with Glaucus atlanticus and Glaucus marginatus.

Distribution
This species is widespread throughout the Indo-Pacific. Recent research shows that it is a complex of more than one species.

Description
Pteraeolidia ianthina, one of the most common aeolids found, is often called a "blue dragon" by Eastern Australian divers because of its close resemblance to a Chinese dragon. It is one of the most common aeolid nudibranchs found in Eastern Australia, and can inflict a painful sting to humans.

The body color of this species is translucent tan, but the cerata, which vary from dark purple to lavender to golden brown, give the nudibranch most of its distinct color. Green specimens are not uncommon.

The slug is elongated with many clusters of medium-large sized cerata along the length of the body. The fat rhinophores and the long cephalic tentacles have at least two dark purple bands that stand out. The tips of the cerata contain nematocysts.

Algal zooxanthellae of the genus Symbiodinium derived from the food of these animals continue to photosynthesise inside the body and give rise to brown and green pigments. Symbiodinium, together with the nematocysts, are presumed to be derived from coelenterate prey. These Symbiodinium occur within vacuoles in host cells derived from the endoderm.

Young specimens are much shorter, have fewer cerata, and are often mistaken for other nudibranch species.

Symbiosis with dinoflagellates
This sea slug feeds on hydroids which contain Symbiodinium, microscopic dinoflagellates that are photosynthetic. The microscopic Symbiodinium acquired from the hydroids are 'farmed' in the sea slug's digestive diverticula, where the Symbiodinium photosynthesizes sugars to be used by the slug. The slug gains enough photosythetically derived sugars to sustain it without feeding.

References
|

Further reading
 Rudman, W. B. (1982). "The taxonomy and biology of further aeolidacean and arminacean nudibranch molluscs with symbiotic zooxanthellae.  Zoological Journal of the Linnean Society 74(2):147-196.
Yonow, N., R. Anderson C. & ButtressS. G. (2002). "Opisthobranch molluscs from the Chagos archipelago, central Indian Ocean". Journal of Natural History 36(7): 831-882.
 Richmond, M. (Ed.) (1997). A guide to the seashores of Eastern Africa and the Western Indian Ocean islands. Sida/Department for Research Cooperation, SAREC: Stockholm, Sweden. . 448 pp. (
 Willan, R. (2009). Opisthobranchia (Mollusca). In: Gordon, D. (Ed.) (2009). New Zealand Inventory of Biodiversity. Volume One: Kingdom Animalia. 584 pp
  Wilson N.G. & Burghardt I. (2015). Here be dragons – phylogeography of Pteraeolidia ianthina (Angas, 1864) reveals multiple species of photosynthetic nudibranchs (Aeolidina: Nudibranchia). Zoological Journal of the Linnean Society. 175(1): 119-133

Facelinidae
Gastropods described in 1864